Hugh O'Neills is a Gaelic football team in Leeds, West Yorkshire, England. It was founded in 1948 and is the longest established team in Yorkshire. It has won the Pennine league 10 years in a row.

The club field teams from junior level to senior, and were all-Britain champions in 1982 and 1999.
Thomas Duffy, captained Hugh O'Neills to a championship title on Sunday 10 May 2015, scoring 2 goals and 3 points. Duffy scored two penalties, after making a comeback from an ankle injury, which made him miss out on seven months of sport.

On Wednesday 20 May 2015, the usually calm-headed Duffy received the first red card of his illustrious career after reacting to a "sneaky" punch while already on the ground. Speaking to reporters Duffy said "I would like to take this opportunity to express my regret and apologies to the fans of Hugh O'Neills. I am going to be speaking to the priest and we'll get a plan of action, I'm thinking at least 20 Hail Marys to start with."

On Thursday 9 July 2015, Hugh O'Neills played Brothers Pearse away in Huddersfield and won a very entertaining contest 6.9 to 4.9. Despite being suspended and not attending the game, Thomas Duffy still managed a haul of 1.3 to ensure Hugh O'Neills left with the win and a place in the final.

In 2017 Hugh O'Neills completed a clean sweep of Junior and Senior football titles in Yorkshire including the Junior League and Championship double, the Pennine league division 2 and the Yorkshire Senior League and Championship double. This was the club's second senior championship in 3 years after also claiming the title in 2015.

References

External links

Listing at gaainfo

Gaelic football clubs in Britain
Sport in Leeds